The United States soccer league system is a series of professional and amateur soccer leagues based, in whole or in part, in the United States. Sometimes called the American soccer pyramid, teams and leagues are not linked by the system of promotion and relegation typical in soccer elsewhere. Instead, the United States Soccer Federation (USSF) defines professional leagues in three levels, called divisions, with all other leagues sanctioned by the USSF not having an official designated level or division.

For practical and historical reasons, some teams from Bermuda, Canada, and Puerto Rico (considered a separate country by FIFA) can also compete in these leagues. However, these teams are not eligible for the U.S. Open Cup and cannot represent the United States in the CONCACAF Champions League because they are not affiliated with U.S. Soccer.

Structure 
No professional league in any of the major pro sports leagues in the U.S. or Canada, including the professional soccer leagues, currently uses a system of promotion and relegation. The country's governing body for the sport, the United States Soccer Federation (also known as the USSF or U.S. Soccer), oversees the league system and is responsible for sanctioning professional leagues. The leagues themselves are responsible for admitting and administering individual teams. Amateur soccer in the United States is regulated by the United States Adult Soccer Association (USASA), the only amateur soccer organization sanctioned by the USSF.  Automatic promotion and relegation between its leagues, as exists in many other national league systems, was considered by United Soccer League, but was never implemented; although voluntary promotion and relegation has occurred. Some amateur leagues sanctioned by the USASA also use promotion and relegation systems within multiple levels of their leagues.  However, there has never been a merit-based promotion system offered to the USASA's "national" leagues, the NPSL and League Two.

College soccer in the United States is sanctioned by bodies outside the direct control of the USSF, the most important of which is the National Collegiate Athletic Association (NCAA). See NCAA Division I women's soccer programs, NCAA Division I men's soccer programs, and NCAA Division II men's soccer programs for a list of college soccer programs in the United States.

General professional standards 
The standards for Division I, II and III leagues are set by the USSF.

Market requirements 
 At least 75% of a league's teams must be based in the United States
 At least a certain percentage of a league's teams must be based in markets with a certain population

Field and stadium requirements 
 All stadiums must have controllable ingress/egress
 All outdoor leagues must be playing on FIFA-approved surfaces at least 70 yards by 110 yards in dimension
 Minimum required stadium fan capacity, dependent on league level
 Each team must have a lease to use its stadium for at least one full season no later than a certain date before each season begins

Financial viability 
 Minimum annual bond each team must pay to the league (or Federation), dependent on league level
 Each ownership group must display the ability to fund their team for a certain number of years
 At least a certain net worth for each team's principal owner

Standards summary table

League specifics

Men's Division I 

Ownership requirements

 League must have a minimum of 12 teams to apply. By year three, the league must have a minimum of 14 teams
 US-based teams must participate in all representative U.S. Soccer and CONCACAF competitions for which they are eligible (ex. U.S. Open Cup, CONCACAF Champions League.)
 The majority owner must have a net worth of US$40 million, and the total ownership group must have a net worth of US$70 million. Both of these net worth requirements must be independent of both the club and the individuals' primary residence.

Market requirements

 Teams located in at least the Eastern, Central and Pacific time zones in the continental United States. These three time zones are required because the majority of the large population centers are located in these time zones
 At least 75% of the league's teams must be based in markets with one million population
 All stadiums must be enclosed
 All league stadiums must have a minimum seating capacity of 15,000
 Not later than 180 days prior to the start of each season, each team shall have a lease for at least one full season with its home stadium

Financial viability

 The league must demonstrate adequate financial viability to ensure continued operation on a season-by-season basis either in the form of a performance bond or similar instrument for each team in the amount of US$1 million or readily available league funds representing US$1 million
 The maximum amount of readily available league funds for covering teams operations is US$20 million
 Any team whose performance bond is used during the season will be required to replenish it at least 120 days prior to the next season
 Each team ownership group must demonstrate the financial capacity to operate the team for five years. As part of the process of demonstrating financial capacity, each ownership group must provide detailed financial history (if applicable) and projections (including a detailed budget) for the team to the Federation in a form satisfactory to the Federation. In addition, each team must have and its governing legal documents must designate one principal owner with a controlling interest who owns at least 35% of the team and has authority to bind the team. Such principal owner must have an individual net worth of at least forty million US dollars (US$40,000,000) exclusive of the value of his/her ownership in the league or team and his/her primary personal residence. The principal owner, together with all other owners, must have a combined individual net worth of at least seventy million US dollars (US$70,000,000) exclusive of the value of ownership interests in the league or team and primary personal residences. Federation shall have the right to require an independent audit to establish that the team meets these net worth requirements; the cost of such audit shall be the responsibility of the team or league. The Federation will take reasonable steps to protect from disclosure and limit access to financial information provided under this section

Media

 The league must have broadcast or cable television contracts that provide for the telecasting of all regular season games as well as the championship game/series. High-quality internet streaming of regular season games satisfies this requirement

Team organization

 All required positions must be filled by full-time staff year-round
 Each US-based team must demonstrate a commitment to a player development program. This requirement may be satisfied by supporting either an amateur or professional reserve team competing in a USSF-sanctioned league or by the league itself
 Each US-based team must maintain teams and a program to develop players at the youth level. This requirement may be satisfied by fielding teams in a Federation academy program

League operations

In addition to the required positions filled by full-time staff, the league office must have full-time staff performing the functions of a chief operations officer, a chief financial officer and a director of marketing/public relations on a year-round basis

Men's Division II 

Ownership requirements

 Principal owner with at least US$20,000,000 net worth, 35% ownership stake.

Markets and stadia
 Year 1: Eight teams in at least 2 time zones
 Year 3: At least 10 teams
 Year 6: at least 12 teams in Eastern, Central, and Pacific time zones
 75% of teams must be in metro areas of at least 750,000 population
 Stadiums must have 5,000 capacity

Men's Division III 

Ownership requirements

 Principal owner with at least US$10,000,000 net worth, 35% ownership stake.

Markets and stadia
 Year 1: Eight teams
 Stadiums must have 1,000 capacity

Men's leagues

Professional leagues 

Since 1996, Major League Soccer (MLS) has been the only sanctioned USSF Division I men's outdoor soccer league in the United States. MLS has grown from 10 teams in 1996 to 29 teams as of the 2023 season.

The USL Championship (USLC) is the only sanctioned Division II men's outdoor soccer league as of 2021. Formed in 2010 as a result of the merger of the former USL First Division and USL Second Division, the USL Championship was sanctioned as Division III league from 2011 to 2016 before becoming provisionally sanctioned as a Division II league for 2017, and receiving full Division II sanctioning in 2018.

The USL Championship expanded almost three-fold since its first season in 2011 to include 35 teams in the 2020 season, with the league divided into two conferences, Eastern and Western. After that season, held amid the backdrop of the COVID-19 pandemic, five teams left the league. At its current membership, the USL Championship is the largest Division II professional league in the world.

The previously Division II North American Soccer League (NASL) was formed in 2009, but did not debut until 2011 following the controversial 2010 season that saw neither the USL First Division nor the NASL receive Division II sanctioning from the USSF, resulting in the temporary USSF Division 2 Pro League. NASL was sanctioned as a Division II league from 2011 to 2016; when it fielded 8 teams for the 2017 season, U.S. Soccer only granted the league provisional sanctioning as it fell under the 12-team requirement. The USSF rejected the NASL's application to maintain provisional Division II status for the 2018 season as the NASL did not present a plan on how it would meet the Division II criteria. In response, the NASL filed "a federal antitrust suit against the U.S. Soccer Federation" in an attempt to force USSF to drop all Division designations. Due to the continuing litigation against U.S. Soccer, the NASL then had to postpone its season to August 2018 and lost four more teams in the process.

In March 2017, United Soccer League announced following the sanctioning of the USL Championship as a Division II league it would start a new tier in its professional structure. USL League One received sanctioning in December 2018 and conducted its first season in 2019 with 10 teams. The league expanded to include 12 teams for its second season in 2020 and further expansion had been planned prior to the 2021 season, but was delayed until 2022 or later by COVID-19.

A second Division III league, National Independent Soccer Association (NISA) debuted in August 2019 with eight teams. The league initially played a fall-to-spring season spanning two calendar years but switched to the standard American schedule in 2022.

In September 2015, it was reported that the USSF was proposing the addition of eligibility requirements for sanctioned Division I soccer leagues, including that they must have at least 16 teams, stadiums with a capacity of at least 15,000, and at least 75% of the teams must be in cities that have a population of at least 2 million.

In 2018, the National Premier Soccer League (NPSL), a nationwide amateur league announced the intention to set up a professional division, NPSL Pro. As part of the announcement, NPSL initiated a single season competition, the NPSL Founders Cup, involving 11 teams that will form the new professional league in 2020. As of 2022 this has not materialized and NPSL remains an amateur league.

Number of teams in each league 
Below is a list of the number of teams sanctioned by the USSF in the so-called "modern era" under the division sanctioning scheme described above.

Notes

Semi-professional and amateur leagues
The USSF does not officially recognize distinctions beyond the three professional divisions above. Currently, three other national leagues are sanctioned by the US Soccer Federation and one of those is part of USASA which is a national association member of the USSF and the only member of the Adult Council. Among the leagues sanctioned by USSF, United Premier Soccer League (UPSL) is a National Affiliate member and National Premier Soccer League (NPSL) is under USASA. Both are recognized in practical terms as playing at a higher level as both are considered national leagues. USL League Two (USL 2) is a national league sanctioned by USL. Both USL2 and NPSL count their league as a qualifying competition for automatic berths to the US Open Cup first round. Additionally, clubs in USL2, UPSL and NPSL pay some of their players and are more accurately described as semi-professional leagues.

USL League Two takes place during the summer months, and has age restrictions. Thus, the player pool is drawn mainly from NCAA college soccer players seeking to continue playing high level soccer during their summer break, while still maintaining their college eligibility. The National Premier Soccer League is similar to USL2 and also attracts top amateur talent from around the United States. However, unlike USL2, the NPSL does not have any age limits or restrictions, thus incorporating both college players and former professional players.. The United Premier Soccer League takes place year round with two seasons, one in spring and one in fall. Unlike USL2 and NPSL, the UPSL does not rely on college players and is the national league with the most diverse participation.

Men's league structure
The table below shows the current structure of the system. For each division, its official name, sponsorship name, number of clubs and conferences/divisions are given. The United States Soccer Federation regulates the standards for a league or division to be recognized as professional, while also determining the level of division for each league.

The system is only defined as far as Division 3. What follows is a list of additional notable leagues, with those having automatic entry into the U.S. Open Cup listed at the top.

Men's national soccer cups
 U.S. Open Cup – open to all US Soccer sanctioned amateur and professional leagues, though professional teams that are owned by, or whose playing staffs are managed by, higher-level outdoor professional teams are barred from entry.
 USASA National Amateur Cup – amateur-only cup tournament
 Hank Steinbrecher Cup – contested between the defending champion, the league winners of the NPSL and USL League Two, and the defending champion of the USASA Amateur Cup.

Women's leagues
The Women's United Soccer Association started playing in 2001, but suspended operations in 2003. It was replaced in 2009 with Women's Professional Soccer. WPS closed after the 2011 season due to a dispute with owners, and the WPSL Elite League was the de facto top tier of women's soccer in 2012. In November 2012 the National Women's Soccer League, sponsored by the United States Soccer Federation, the Canadian Soccer Association and the Mexican Football Federation was announced. The league started play in April 2013. Mexico withdrew from sponsorship of the NWSL once it established its own women's league in 2017.

For many years, there were two leagues that acted as an unofficial lower division. The United Soccer Leagues ran the W-League from 1995 to 2015. The Women's Premier Soccer League (WPSL) was founded in 1998.  Almost immediately following the demise of the W-League, United Women's Soccer was founded with orphan W-League teams and WPSL breakaways. UWS then formed a U23 reserve league, UWS2, in early 2020.

After the 2019 FIFA Women's World Cup, USL began exploring the idea of creating a professional league to directly compete with NWSL. This effort ultimately was scaled back to running an amateur revival of the W-League, which would operate beneath the DII WISL (operated by NISA) and a planned DIII league run by UWS. The amateur USL W League was official revived in June 2021, called by USL as "pre-professional", and the new USL Super League was announced for professional Division II status three months later in direct competition to WISL, both of which aim to launch in 2023.

While there was never official distinction between the national amateur leagues, it was commonly assumed that the W-League was a higher quality than WPSL. Two W-League teams had effectively promoted into the first division – the Buffalo Flash becoming the Western New York Flash in 2011 and D.C. United Women becoming the Washington Spirit in 2013 – while no WPSL teams have ever done so. UWS, as W-League's spiritual successor, has strengthened this image of being the higher-quality amateur league by attracting four teams that had been associated with WPSL Elite.

Women's national soccer cups
 NWSL Challenge Cup – open to NWSL teams
 USASA National Women's Open – open to WPSL and UWS teams
 USASA National Women's Amateur – open to all USASA-affiliated women's teams

Indoor soccer
Indoor soccer in North America is governed by the Confederación Panamericana de Minifutbol (CPM), a member of the World Minifootball Federation (WMF).

See also
 Soccer in the United States
 List of soccer clubs in the United States
 Record attendances in United States club soccer
 Canadian soccer league system

References

External links
USSF Standards 2014
United States Soccer Federation
United Soccer Leagues
United States Futsal Federation

Football league systems in North America